Chandrakant Mali  is an Indian Weightlifter, who  won bronze medal in the men's 94 kg weight class at the 2014 Commonwealth Games at Glasgow, Scotland.

References

Living people
Indian male weightlifters
Weightlifters at the 2010 Asian Games
Commonwealth Games bronze medallists for India
Weightlifters at the 2014 Commonwealth Games
Commonwealth Games medallists in weightlifting
Year of birth missing (living people)
Asian Games competitors for India
21st-century Indian people
Medallists at the 2014 Commonwealth Games